The AML Awards are given annually by the Association for Mormon Letters (AML) to the best work "by, for, and about Mormons." They are juried awards, chosen by a panel of judges. Citations for many of the awards can be found on the AML website.

The award categories vary from year to year depending on the shape of the market and what the AML decides is worthy of honor. Beginning with the 2014 awards, the AML began creating a shortlist of finalists for most categories, which preceded the final awards.

1970s

1980s

1990s

2000s

2010 
Smith-Pettit Award for Outstanding Contribution to Mormon Letters
Richard Cracroft

Biography
Marilyn Arnold for Bittersweet: A Daughter's Memoir

Criticism
Grant Hardy for Understanding the Book of Mormon: A Reader's Guide 

Drama / WebFilm
Jeffrey Parkin & Jared Cardon for The Book of Jer3miah

Editing
Eric W. Jepson for "Comics!" Sunstone #160 
Angela Hallstrom for Dispensation: Latter-day Fiction

Memoir
George B. Handley for Home Waters: A Year of Recompenses on the Provo River

Novel
Brady Udall for The Lonely Polygamist: A Novel

Online Writing
Ardis Parshall for "Beards" on Keepapitchinin

Personal Essay
Patrick Madden for Quotidiana

Poetry
Marilyn Bushman-Carlton for Her Side of It: Poems

Service to AML
Darlene Young

Short Fiction
Jack Harrell for A Sense of Order and Other Stories

Short Fiction Honorable Mention
Darin Cozzens for Light of the New Day

Young Adult Literature
Ally Condie for Matched

2011

Smith-Pettit Award for Outstanding Contribution to Mormon Letters
Marilyn Brown

Honorary Lifetime Membership
Gideon Burton

Biography
Terryl L. Givens and Matthew J. Grow for Parley P. Pratt: The Apostle Paul of Mormonism

Autobiography
Emma Lou Warner Thayne for The Place of Knowing: a Spiritual Autobiography

Criticism
Brant A. Gardner for The Gift and Power : Translating the Book of Mormon

Film
Tyler Measom and Jennilyn Merten for Sons of Perdition

Special Award in Graphical Narrative
Michael Dalton Allred for a lifetime of comic art

Novel
Steven L. Peck for The Scholar of Moab

Personal Essay
Adam Miller, for the body of his work published in 2011

Poetry
Tyler Chadwick for editing Fire in the Pasture: Twenty-first Century Mormon Poets (Peculiar Pages)

Short Story
David G. Pace for "American Trinity"

Short Fiction
Doug Thayer for Wasatch: Mormon Stories and a Novella

Special Award in Literary Journalism
Andrew Hall

Young Adult Novel
Robison Wells for Variant

Marilyn Brown Novel Award
Paul Colt for Boots and Saddles: A Call to Glory

2012
Smith–Pettit Foundation Award for Outstanding Contribution to Mormon Letters
Eric Samuelsen

Lifetime AML Membership
Mahonri Stewart
Christopher Bigelow
Film
Redemption, directed by Thomas Russell

Novel
The Five Books of Jesus by James Goldberg

Devotional
The God Who Weeps: How Mormonism Makes Sense of Life by Terryl and Fiona Givens

Poetry
Amytis Leaves Her Garden by Karen Kelsay

Award in Adaptation
The Street-Legal Version of Mormon’s Book by Michael Hicks

Drama
Roof Overhead by Mahonri Stewart

Short Fiction
"Godshift" by Nancy Fulda (originally appeared in Daily Science Fiction)

Young Adult Novel
Vodnik by Bryce Moore

Memoir/Creative Non Fiction
The Book of Mormon Girl by Joanna Brooks

Middle Grade Fiction Award
False Prince by Jennifer A. Nielsen

Humor
"Pat and Pete" by Larry Day (from his collection Day Dreaming: Tales from the Fourth Dementia)

2013
Given out April 12, 2014.

Smith–Pettit Foundation Award for Outstanding Contribution to Mormon Letters
Charlotte Hawkins England

Outstanding Achievement Award
Dean Hughes

Creative non-fiction
Melissa Dalton-Bradford for Global Mom: Eight Countries, Sixteen Addresses, Five Languages, One Family

Drama
Ariel Mitchell for A Second Birth

Film
Garrett Batty for The Saratov Approach

Special Award
Scott Hales for The Garden of Enid

Novel
Sarah Eden Longing for Home

Poetry
Alex Caldiero sonosuono (awarded on March 28, 2015)
Other finalists
Susan Elizabeth Howe Salt
Lance Larsen Genius Loci

Short Fiction
Brad R. Torgersen “The Chaplain’s Legacy”. Analog Science Fiction and Fact, July/August 2013 (awarded on March 28, 2015)
Other finalists
“The Righteous Road” by Ryan Shoemaker, Silk Road Review, Summer/Fall 2013
“Expiation” by Richard Dutcher, Sunstone 171, July 2013
“Duplex” by Eric Freeze, Prairie Fire 34.1, Spring 2013
“The Gift of Tongues” by Annette Haws, Dialogue: A Journal of Mormon Thought, Winter 2013

Young Adult Fiction
Cindy M. Hogan Gravediggers

Young Adult Speculative Fiction
Brandon Sanderson for The Rithmatist

2014
Presented March 28, 2015, at the Utah Valley University Library.

Smith–Pettit Foundation Award for Outstanding Contribution to Mormon Letters
Margaret Blair Young

AML Lifetime Achievement Award
Lance Larsen
Karen Rosenbaum

Comics
iPlates, Volume 2: Prophets, Priests, Rebels, and Kings by Stephen Carter and Jett Atwood

Creative non-fiction
Hemingway on a Bike by Eric Freeze
Other finalists
To the Mountain: One Mormon Woman’s Search for Spirit by Phyllis Barber
Way Below the Angels: The Pretty Clearly Troubled But Not Even Close to Tragic Confessions of a Real Live Mormon Missionary by Craig Harline
Hippie Boy: A Girl’s Story by Ingrid Ricks

Criticism
Ender’s World: Fresh Perspectives on the SF Classic Ender’s Game, Orson Scott Card, editor 
Other finalists
“Of Many Hearts and Many Minds: The Mormon Novel and the Post-Utopian Challenge of Assimilation” by Scott Hales. Dissertation, University of Cincinnati
“Toward a Mormon Literary Theory” by Jack Harrell. BYU Studies Quarterly 53.3, 2014

Drama
Pride and Prejudice by Melissa Leilani Larsen
Other finalists
The Weaver of Raveloe by Erika Glenn and Melissa Leilani Larsen
Single Wide by George Nelson and Jordan Kamalu
Evening Eucalyptus by Mahonri Stewart

Film
Saints and Soldiers: The Void, Ryan Little, director
Other finalists
Inspired Guns, Adam White, director
The Last Straw, Rob Diamond, director
Meet the Mormons, Blair Treu, director
Mitt, Greg Whiteley, director

Middle Grade Novel
The Scandalous Sisterhood of Prickwillow Place by Julie Berry
Honorable Mention: The End or Something Like That by Ann Dee Ellis
Other finalists
Almost Super by Marion Jensen
Time of the Fireflies by Kimberley Griffiths Little
Sky Raiders by Brandon Mull

Novel
City of Brick and Shadow by Tim Wirkus
Honorable Mention: Words of Radiance by Brandon Sanderson 
Other finalists
A Song for Issy Bradley by Carys Bray
The Bishop’s Wife by Mette Ivie Harrison
The Thieves of Summer by Linda Sillitoe

Picture Book
Girls Who Choose God: Stories of Courageous Women from the Bible by McArthur Krishna and Bethany Brady Spalding, illustrated by Kathleen Peterson
Honorable Mention: The Princess in Black by Shannon Hale and Dean Hale, illustrated by LeUyen Pham
Other finalists
Fetch by Adam Glendon Sidwell, illustrated by Edwin Rhemrev
The World According to Musk Ox by Erin Cabatingan, illustrated by Matthew Myers
The Tooth Fairy Wars by Kate Coombs, illustrated by Jake Parker

Poetry
Picture Dictionary by Kristen Eliason
Other finalists
Uncommon Prayer and Made Flesh: Sacrament and Poetics in Post-Reformation England by Kimberly Johnson
In the Museum of Coming and Going by Laura Stott

Religious Non-Fiction
Re-Reading Job: Understanding the Ancient World’s Greatest Poem by Michael Austin
Other finalists
Seeking the Promised Land by David E. Campbell, John C. Green, and J. Quin Monson. Cambridge University Press
Wresting the Angel by Terryl Givens

Short Fiction
“Two-Dog Dose” by Steven L. Peck, Dialogue: A Journal of Mormon Thought, Spring 2014
Other finalists
“Recollection” by Nancy Fulda, Carbide Tipped Pens
“Anatomy” by Tim Wirkus, Weird Fiction Review, June 2014
“Jesus Enough” by Levi S. Peterson, Dialogue: A Journal of Mormon Thought, Winter 2014

Young Adult General Novel
Death Coming Up the Hill by Chris Crowe
Other finalists
Forbidden by Kimberley Griffiths Little
On the Fence by Kasie West
Signed, Skye Harper by Carol Lynch Williams
Stronger than You Know by Jolene Perry

Young Adult Speculative Novel
Atlantia by Ally Condie
Other finalists
The Paper Magician by Charlie Holmberg
The Unhappening of Genesis Lee by Shallee McArthur
Son of War, Daughter of Chaos by Janette Rallison
Ruins by Dan Wells
Illusions of Fate by Kiersten White

2015
Presented March 5, 2016, at the Heber J. Grant building on Brigham Young University-Hawaii campus.

The Smith-Pettit Foundation Award for Outstanding Contribution to Mormon Letters
Phyllis Barber

The Association for Mormon Letters Lifetime Achievement Award
Donald R. Marshall

Special Awards for Scholarly Publishing
The Oxford Handbook of Mormonism edited by Terryl L. Givens and Philip L. Barlow
Nephi Anderson's Dorian: A Peculiar Edition With Annotated Text & Scholarship edited by Eric W. Jepson

Comics
Dendō: One Year and One Half in Japan by Brittany Long Olsen
Other finalists
Stripling Warrior by Brian Andersen and James Neish
My Hot Date by Noah van Sciver

Creative Non-Fiction
My Wife Wants You to Know I’m Happily Married by Joey Franklin
Other finalists
The Accidental Terrorist by William Shunn
Fresh Courage Take: New Directions by Mormon Women edited by Jamie Zvirzdin

Criticism
Jana Riess "Mormon Popular Culture" from the first of the two nominated collections below
The Oxford Handbook of Mormonism edited by Terryl L. Givens and Philip L. Barlow
Other finalists
Nephi Anderson's Dorian: A Peculiar Edition With Annotated Text & Scholarship edited by Eric W. Jepson

Drama
Pilot Program by Melissa Leilani Larson
Other finalists
A/Version of Events by Matthew Ivan Bennett
Princess Academy by Lisa Hall Hagen, adapted from Shannon Hale

Film
Peace Officer, by Scott Christopherson and Brad Barber
Other finalists
Christmas Eve, by Mitch Davis
Freetown, by Garrett Batty
Just Let Go, by Christopher S. Clark and Patrick Henry Parker
Once I Was a Beehive, by Maclain Nelson

Lyrics
The Desired Effect from Brandon Flowers
Other finalists
Smoke + Mirrors from Imagine Dragons 
Ones and Sixes from Low
 Until I Live from The National Parks

Middle Grade Novel
Mothman’s Curse by Christine Hayes
Other finalists
A Night Divided by Jennifer A. Nielsen
Mysteries of Cove: Fires of Invention by J. Scott Savage
The Sound of Life and Everything by Krista Van Dolzer
Survival Strategies of the Almost Brave by Jen White

Novel
Sistering by Jennifer Quist
Other finalists
The Agitated Heart by J. Scott Bronson
Son of the Black Sword by Larry Correia
His Right Hand by Mette Ivie Harrison

Picture Book
Zombelina Dances the Nutcracker by Kristyn Crow
Other finalists
Talon Wrestles an Anaconda by Auntie M (McArthur Krishna)
Girls Who Choose God: Stories of strong women from the Book of Mormon by McArthur Krishna, Bethany Brady Spalding, and Kathleen Peterson
Job Wanted by Teresa Bateman

Poetry
Hive by Christina Stoddard
Other finalists
Glyphs by Colin Douglas
Lake of Fire: Landscape Meditations from the Great Basin Deserts of Nevada by Justin Evans
Let Me Drown With Moses by James Goldberg

Religious Non-Fiction
Traditions of the Fathers: The Book of Mormon as History by Brant A. Gardner
Other finalists
The Oxford Handbook of Mormonism edited by Terryl L. Givens and Philip L. Barlow
Postponing Heaven: The Three Nephites, the Bodhisattva, and the Mahdi by Jad Hatem, translated by Jonathon Penny
Planted: Belief and Belonging in an Age of Doubt by Patrick Q. Mason
Relational Grace: The Reciprocal and Binding Covenant of Charis by Brent J. Schmidt

Short Story
"Remainder" by Spencer Hyde (Bellevue Literary Review)
Other finalists
"The Naked Woman" by Theric Jepson (Pulp Literature)
"Absolute Zero" by Scott Parkin (1st & Starlight)
"An Immense Darkness" by Eric James Stone (Analog Science Fiction and Fact)

Short-Story Collection
Mothers, Daughters, Sisters, Wives by Karen Rosenbaum
Other finalists
Dark Watch and Other Mormon-American Stories by William Morris
Wandering Realities: Mormonish Short Fiction  by Steve L. Peck

Young Adult Novel
The Storyspinner by Becky Wallace
Other finalists
Shutter by Courtney Alameda
Ink and Ashes by Valynne Maetani
Firefight by Brandon Sanderson
Fish Out of Water by Natalie Whipple

2016
Presented at Utah Valley University, April 22, 2017.

The Smith-Pettit Foundation Award for Outstanding Contribution to Mormon Letters
Orson Scott Card

AML Lifetime Achievement Award
Susan Elizabeth Howe

Comics
Precious Rascals by Anthony Holden
Other finalists
Mormon Shorts, Vol. 1 by Scott Hales
White Sand by Brandon Sanderson (story), Rik Hoskin (script), Julius Gopez (art), and Ross Campbell (colors)

Creative Non-fiction
Sublime Physick by Patrick Madden
Honorable Mention
Baring Witness: 36 Mormon Women Talk Candidly about Love, Sex and Marriage edited by Holly Welker
Other finalists
Immortal for Quite Some Time by Scott Abbott
The Latter Days: A Memoir by Judith Freeman
One Hundred Birds Taught me to Fly by Ashley Mae Hoiland

Criticism
Writing Ourselves: Essays on Creativity, Craft, and Mormonism by Jack Harrell

Drama
Burn by Morag Shepherd
Other finalists
Gregorian by Matthew Greene
Kingdom of Heaven by Jenifer Nii
The King’s Men by Javen Tanner

Film
The Split House by Annie Poon
Other finalists
Masterminds by Jared Hess
The Next Door by Barrett Burgin
Raiders! The Story of the Greatest Fan Film Ever Made by Jeremy Coon and Tim Skousen
Saturday's Warrior by Michael Buster

Middle Grade Novel
Summerlost by Ally Condie
Other finalists
The Kidnap Plot: The Incredible Adventures of Clockwork Charlie by Dave Butler
Cinnamon Moon by Tess Hilmo
Red: The True Story of Red Riding Hood by Liesl Shurtliff

Novel
Over Your Dead Body by Dan Wells
Other finalists
Slave Queen by Heather. B. Moore
Pigs When they Straddle the Air by Julie J. Nichols
Daredevils by Shawn Vestal

Picture Book
Our Heavenly Family, Our Earthly Families by McArthur Krishna and Bethany Brady Spalding. Illustrated by Caitlin Connolly
Other finalists
What Would It Be Like by McArthur Krishna, Illustrated by Ayeshe Sadr & Ishaan Dasgupta
She Stood for Freedom: The Untold Story of a Civil Rights Hero by Loki Mulholland and Angela Fairwell. Illustrated by Charlotte Janssen
Defenders of the Family by Benjamin Hyrum White. Illustrated by Jay Fontana

Poetry
Strange Terrain by Matthew James Babcock
Other finalists
Leviathan by Neil Aitken
flicker by Lisa Bickmore
Who is the Dancer, What is the Dance by Alex Caldiero
Kill February by Jeffrey Tucker

Religious Non-fiction
As Iron Sharpens Iron: Listening to the Various Voices of Scripture edited by Julie M. Smith
Other finalists
Nothing New Under the Sun: A Blunt Paraphrase of Ecclesiastes by Adam S. Miller
The Ghost of Eternal Polygamy by Carol Lynn Pearson
The Vision of All: Twenty-five Lectures on Isaiah in Nephi’s Record by Joseph M. Spencer

Special Award for Religious Non-fiction Publishing
Let Your Hearts and Minds Expand: Reflections on Faith, Reason, Charity, and Beauty by Thomas F. Rogers, edited by Jonathan Langford and Linda Hunter Adams

Short Fiction
"Kid Kirby" by Levi S. Peterson (Dialogue: A Journal of Mormon Thought, 49:2, Summer 2016)
Other finalists
"And Thorns Will Grow There" by Emily Belanger, Sunstone #180, Spring 2016
"Light as Wings" by Spencer Hyde, Glimmer Train. Fall 2016, #97
"The Mandelbrot Set" by Heidi Naylor, Sunstone, #182, Fall 2016
"Incomplete Slaughter" by Steven L. Peck, The Colored Lens, Summer 2016
"Purytans" by Brad R. Torgersen, Analog: Science Fact and Fiction, July/Aug 2016

Short Fiction Collection
The Last Blessing of J. Guyman LeGrand and Other Stories by Darin Cozzens
Other finalists
Invisible Men by Eric Freeze
Windows into Hell by various authors, edited by James Wymore

Video Series
Last Chance U Greg Whiteley, director
Other finalists
Adam & Eve Davey & Bianca Morrison Dillard, directors
Studio C Jared Shores and Matt Meese, co-creators
The Talking Fly Steve Olpin, director

Young Adult Novel
The Serpent King by Jeff Zentner
Other finalists
The Passion of Dolssa by Julie Berry
And I Darken by Kiersten White

2017

The final winners were presented March 23, 2018.
Smith-Pettit Foundation Award for Outstanding Contribution to Mormon Letters
Lavina Fielding Anderson

AML Lifetime Achievement Award
Robert Kirby

Novel
Gilda Trillim: Shepherdess of Rats by Steven L. Peck (Roundfire Books)
The Field is White by Claire Åkebrand (Kernpunct Press)
Sins of Empire by Brian McClellan (Orbit/Hachette Book Press)
Prayers in Bath by Luisa Perkins (Mormon Artists Group)
Nothing Left to Lose by Dan Wells (Tor)

Short fiction"The Pew" by Alison Maeser Brimley (originally published in Dialogue)"Le Train à Grande Vitesse" R.A. Christmas (originally published in Dialogue)
"The Thicket" by Bradeigh Godfrey (originally published in Sunstone)
"Jane’s Journey" by Heidi Naylor (originally published in Sunstone) 
"Bishop Johansen Rescues a Lost Soul: A Tale of Pleasant Grove" by Steven L. Peck (originally published in Dialogue)

Creative nonfictionThat We May Be One: A Gay Mormon’s Perspective on Faith and Family by Tom ChristoffersonLearning to Like Life: A Tribute to Lowell Bennion by George B. Handley
The Burning Point by Tracy McKay
Open Midnight: Where Ancestors and Wilderness Meet by Brooke Williams
Notable mentions
Heterodoxologies: Essays by Matthew James Babcock
The OCD Mormon: Finding healing and hope in the midst of anxiety by Kari Ferguson
Do Clouds Rest? Dementiadventures with Mom by Michael Hicks

Religious nonfictionWhat is Mormonism? A Student’s Introduction by Patrick Q. MasonFeeding the Flock: The Foundations of Mormon Thought: Church and Praxis by Terryl L. Givens
The Sun Has Burned My Skin by Adam S. Miller
Perspectives on Mormon Theology: Apologetics edited by Blair G. Van Dyke and Loyd Isao Ericson

Middle-grade novelYou May Already Be A Winner by Ann Dee Ellis (Dial Books for Young Readers)
Under Locker and Key by Allison K. Hymas (Aladdin)
Mustaches for Maddie by Chad Morris and Shelly Brown (Shadow Mountain)
Forget Me Not by Ellie Terry (Feiwel and Friends)
Paper Chains by Elaine Vickers (Harper)

Young-adult novelGoodbye Days by Jeff Zentner (Crown Books for Young Readers)
Speak Easy, Speak Love by McKelle George (Greenwilow Books)
The Duke of Bannerman Prep by Katie A. Nelson (Sky Pony Press)
Last Star Burning by Caitlin Sangster (Simon Pulse)
Now I Rise by Kiersten White (Delacorte Press)

ComicsReal Friends by Shannon Hale and LeUyen PhamBatman ’66 / Legion of Super Heroes #1 (DC Comics) by Lee Allred, Michael Allred, Laura Allred
The Garden of Enid: Adventures of a Weird Mormon Girl, Vol. 2. by Scott Hales
Comic Diaries by Brittany Long Olsen
Necropolis by Jake Wyatt and Kathryn Wyatt

Picture bookColour Blocked by Ashley Sorenson and David W. MilesHeroic Stories from The Book of Mormon by Shauna Gibby and Casey Nelson
Quiet as a Church Mouse by Stephen Bevan and Jeff Harvey

DramaVirtue by Tim SloverThe Drown’ed Book, or the History of William Shakespeare, Part Last by Mahonri Stewart
Not One Drop by Morag Shepherd

FilmSocorro written and directed by Marshal DavisThe Man in the Camo Jacket written and directed by Russ Kendall
Out of the Ground written and directed by Barrett Burgin
A Pug & Wolf Christmas created by Davey and Bianca Morrison Dillard
We Love You, Sally Carmichael! written by Daryn Tufts and directed by Christopher Gorham

Criticism“The Second Coming of Mormon Music,” by Michael Hicks from The Kimball Challenge at Fifty: Mormon Arts Center Essays (part of original nominee The Kimball Challenge at Fifty: Mormon Arts Center Essays from Mormon Arts Center)
 On the Problem and Promise of Alex Caldiero’s Sonosophy: Doing Dialogical Coperformative Ethnography; Or, Enter the Poetarium by Tyler Chadwick

Anthology
Moth and Rust: Mormon Encounters with Death edited by Stephen CarterSeasons of Change: Stories of Transition from the Writers of Segullah edited by Shelah Mastny Miner and Sandra Clark Jergensen
States of Deseret edited by Wm Morris

PoetryMother's Milk by Rachel Hunt SteenblikBabbage’s Dream by Neil Aitken
What Was Left of the Stars by Claire Åkebrand
Ephemerist by Lisa Bickmore
Owning the Moon by Linda Sillitoe

Special Award in Religious Non-Fiction PublishingProceedings of the Mormon Theology Seminar, published by the Neal A. Maxwell Institute for Religious Scholarship’s Mormon Theology Seminar, Adam S. Miller, director2018

The final winners were presented March 30, 2019, in Berkeley, California.
AML Lifetime Achievement Award"2018 AML Award Winners." Dawning of a Brighter Day. Association for Mormon Letters. 30 March 2019. Accessed 31 March 2019.
Carol Lynn Pearson

Smith-Pettit Foundation Award for Outstanding Contribution to Mormon Letters
Melissa Leilani Larson

Special Award in Publishing
Dove Song: Heavenly Mother in Mormon Poetry edited by Tyler Chadwick, Dayna Patterson, Martin Pulido (Peculiar Pages)

NovelWitchy Winter by D. J. Butler (Baen Books)
The Apocalypse of Morgan Turner by Jennifer Quist (Linda Leith Publishing)
The Infinite Future by Tim Wirkus (Penguin Press)

Short-fiction collections
The Science of Lost Futures by Ryan Habermeyer (BOA Editions)
Revolver by Heidi Naylor (BCC Press)
Beyond the Lights by Ryan Shoemaker (No Record Press)

Short fiction
"Thin Walls" by Alison Maeser Brimley (Western Humanities Review)
"All Light and Darkness" by Amy Henrie Gillett (Writers of the Future)
"Tower" by Ryan McIlvain (Sunstone)
"Light Departure" by Ryan Shoemaker (Dialogue)

Drama
Good Standing by Matthew Greene
The Shower Principle by Ariel Mitchell

Poetry
What the Body Knows by Lance Larsen (University of Tampa Press)
The Lapidary’s Nosegay by Lara Candland (The Center for Literary Publishing, Colorado State University)
The God Mask by Javen Tanner (Kelsay Books)
Half-Hazard by Kristen Tracy (Graywolf Press)

Creative nonfiction
Destroying Their God:  How I Fought My Evil Half-Brother to Save my Children by Wallace Jeffs, Shauna Packer, Sherry Taylor
Educated: A Memoir by Tara Westover
How the Light Gets In by Keira Shae

Religious nonfiction
An Early Resurrection: Life in Christ Before you Die by Adam S. Miller
Faith Is Not Blind by Bruce C. Hafen and Marie K. Hafen
Thou Art the Christ, the Son of the Living God: The Person and Work of Jesus in the New Testament edited by Eric D. Huntsman, Lincoln H. Blumell, and Tyler J. Griffin
The Power of Godliness: Mormon Liturgy and Cosmology by Jonathan Stapley
On Fire in Baltimore: Black Mormon Women and Conversion in a Raging City by Laura Rutter Strickling

Criticism
Mormon Cinema: Origins to 1952 by Randy Astle
"Low and the Hermeneutics of Silence" by Jacob Bender (Sunstone)
"Isms and Prisms: A Mormon View on Writing about Nature and Women" by Ángel Chaparro-Sainz (Women’s Studies)
"Mormon Poetry, 2012 to the Present" by Bert Fuller (Dialogue)
A Book about the Film Monty Python’s Life of Brian: All the References from Assyrians to Zeffirelli by Darl Larsen

Comics
One Dirty Tree by Noah Van Sciver (Uncivilized Books)
Green Monk: Blood of the Martyrs by Brandon Dayton (Image Comics)
Comic Diaries, Vol. 1 by Brittany Long Olsen (Self-published)
SkyHeart Book One: The Search for the Star Seed by Jake Parker (Self-published)
Cooties #11 by Nick Perkins

Documentary film
Church & State
Believer
The Insufferable Groo
States of America

Narrative film
When She Runs
Jane and Emma
Long Haul
Passenger Seat

Picture book
The Dress and the Girl by Camille Andros and Julie Morstad (Abrams Books for Young Readers)
Jesus is Born: A Flashlight Discovery Book by Shauna Gibby and Casey Nelson (Deseret Book)
The Princess in Black and the Science Fair Scare by Shannon Hale, Dean Hale, LeUyen Pham (Candlewick Press)
If Wendell Had a Walrus by Lori Mortensen and Matt Phelan (Henry Holt and Company)
If Da Vinci Painted a Dinosaur by Amy Newbold and Greg Newbold (Tilbury House Publishers)

Middle-grade novel
Squint by Chad Morris and Shelley Brown (Shadow Mountain)
Where the Watermelons Grow by Cindy Baldwin (Harper)
Wishes and Wellingtons by Julie Berry (Sourcebooks Young Readers)
Resistance by Jennifer A. Nielsen (Scholastic Press)
Grump: The (Fairly) True Tale of Snow White and the Seven Dwarves by Liesl Shurtliff (Alfred A. Knopf)

Young-adult novel
The Dark Descent of Elizabeth Frankenstein by Kiersten White (Delacorte Press)
Daughter of the Siren Queen by Tricia Levenseller (Feiwel and Friends)
The Traitor’s Game by Jennifer A. Nielsen (Scholastic Press)
Skyward by Brandon Sanderson (Delacorte Press)

2019

The final winners were presented May 2, 2020, online, due to a cancellation of the 2020 AML Conference caused by the COVID-19 pandemic.

Smith-Pettit Foundation Award for Outstanding Contribution to Mormon Letters
 James Arrington

Lifetime Achievement Award
 R. A. Christmas

Special awards
 in Literature and Art
 HIVE ZINE
 The ARCH-HIVE
 in Literature and Performance
 Thorns and Thistles: A Concert of Literature
 Curated and compiled by James Goldberg and Nicole Wilkes Goldberg, directed by Ariel Rivera, music by Nicole Pinnell; supported by and performed at the Center for Latter-day Saint Arts
 in Literature
 Irreversible Things
Lisa Van Orman Hadley

Novel
 Muddy: Where Faith and Polygamy Collide by Dean Hughes (Deseret Book) The Cunning Man by D. J. Butler and Aaron Ritchey (Baen Books)
 Irreversible Things by Lisa Van Orman Hadley (Howling Bird Press)
 Maggie’s Place by Annette Haws (Covenant Communications)
 The Glovemaker by Ann Weisgarber (Skyhorse Publishing)

Short fiction
 "Next of Kin" by Karen Rosenbaum (Irreantum) "You Can Give Him a Kiss" by Alison Maeser Brimley (Sunstone)
 "My Father’s Liahona" by Danny Nelson (In Press Forward Saints: A Mormon Steampunk Anthology)
 "Bode and Iris" by Levi Peterson (Dialogue: A Journal of Mormon Thought)

Young-adult novel
 Lovely War by Julie Berry (Viking Press) Let’s Call it a Doomsday by Katie Henry (Katherine Tegan Books)
 Scars Like Wings by Erin Stewart (Delacorte)
 Waiting for Fitz by Spencer Hyde (Shadow Mountain)

Middle-grade novel
 Words on Fire by Jennifer A. Nielsen (Scholastic) Out to Get You: Thirteen Tales of Weirdness and Woe by Josh Allen (Holiday House)
 The Red Flower by Kate Coombs (Blue Sparrow Books)
 Time Castaways: #1 The Mona Lisa Key and #2 The Obsidian Compass by Liesl Shurtliff (HarperCollins)

Picture book
 Girls Who Choose God: Stories of Extraordinary Women from Church History by McArthur Krishna, Bethany Brady Spalding, Kathleen Peterson (Deseret Book) From a Small Seed: the Story of Eliza Hamilton by Camille Andros and Tessa Blackham (Henry Holt)
 If Monet Painted a Monster by Amy Newbold and Greg Newbold (Tilbury House Publishers)
 Lola Dutch: When I Grow Up by Kenneth Wright and Sarah Jane Wright (Bloomsbury Children’s Books)

Drama
 Project X by Taylor Hatch Tales of Tila by Carolyn Chatwin Murset
 Bitter Lemon by Melissa Leilani Larson

Narrative feature films
 The Other Side of Heaven 2: Fire of Faith directed by Mitch Davis The Fighting Preacher directed by T.C. Christensen
 Out of Liberty directed by Garrett Batty

Documentary feature films
 Jimmer: The Lonely Master directed by Scott Christopherson After Selma directed by Loki Mulholland
 The Jets: Making it Real directed by Kels Goodman

Short film
 "Father of Man" directed by Barrett Burgin "Paper Trails" directed by Heather Moser
 "Stickup Kid" directed by Daniel Tu
 "Man and Kin" directed by Max Johnson

Poetry
 Homespun and Angel Feathers by Darlene Young (BCC Press) Into the Sun: Poems Revised, Rearranged, and New by Colin Douglas (Waking Lion Press)
 After Earth by Michael Lavers (University of Tampa Press)
 The Tree at the Center by Kathryn Knight Sonntag (BCC Press)
 The Marriage of the Moon and the Field by Sunni Brown Wilkinson (Black Lawrence Press)

Criticism
 "Poetic Representations of Mormon Women in Late Nineteenth-Century Frontier America" by Amy Easton-Flake in Representing Rural Women (edited by Whitney Womack Smith and Margaret Thomas-Evans, Lexington Books) "Danites, Damsels, and World Domination: Mormons in the Dime Novels" by Michael Austin in Sunstone
 "Wrestling with God: Invoking Scriptural Mythos in LDS Literary Work" by James Goldberg in Remember the Revolution: Mormon Essays and Stories (self-published)
 Mormons, Musical Theatre, and Belonging in America by Jake Johnson (University of Illinois Press)
 Latter-day Screens: Gender, Sexuality, and Mediated Mormonism by Brenda R. Weber (Duke University Press)

Creative nonfiction
 Crossings: A Bald Asian-American Latter-day Saint Woman Scholar’s Ventures through Life, Death, Cancer, & and Motherhood by Melissa Wei-Tsing Inouye (Deseret Book/Maxwell Institute) Remember the Revolution: Mormon Essays and Stories by James Goldberg (self-published)
 A New Constellation: A Memoir by Ashley Mae Hoiland (BCC Press)

Religious nonfiction
 A Place to Belong: Reflections from Modern Latter-day Saint Women edited by Hollie Rhees Fluhman and Camille Fronk Olson (Deseret Book) If Truth Were a Child: Essays by George B. Handley (Maxwell Institute)
 The Next Mormons: How Millennials Are Changing the LDS Church by Jana Riess (Oxford University Press)

Comics
 That’s One Small Step for a Mom, One Giant Leap for Missionarykind by Kevin Beckstrom (self-published) Dick Tracy: Dead or Alive by Michael Allred, Lee Allred, Rich Tommaso, Laura Allred (IDW Publishing)
 Best Friends by Shannon Hale and LeUyen Pham (First Second)
 Super Elders & the Rise of Legion  by Matt Vroom (self-published)

2020

The final winners were presented June 5, 2021, as part of an online-only conference, due to the COVID-19 pandemic.AML Awards as livestreamed by the Association for Mormon Letters. June 5, 2021. Accessed June 5, 2021.

Lifetime AchievementJohn Serge BennionSmith-Pettit Foundation Award for Outstanding Contribution to Mormon Letters
 Steven L. PeckSpecial Award in Religious NonfictionThe Book of Mormon: Brief Theological Introductions (Maxwell Institute)
 General editors: Spencer Fluhman and Philip Barlow
 Series editors: D. Morgan Davis, James E. Faulconer, Kristine Haglund, Joseph M. Spencer, Rosalynde Welch
 Authors:  Joseph M. Spencer, Terryl L. Givens, Deidre Nicole Green, Sharon J. Harris, James E. Faulconer, Kylie Turley, Mark Wrathall, Kimberly Berkey, Daniel Becerra, Adam S. Miller, Rosalynde Frandsen Welch, David F. Holland
 Illustrator: Brian Kershisnik

Special Award in Nonfiction
This is the Plate: Utah Food Traditions (University of Utah Press)
Editors: Carol Edison, Eric A. Eliason, Lynne S McNeill

Novel
Bountiful by Charity Shumway (BCC Press)
 Other finalists:
The Desert Between Us by Phyllis Barber (University of Nevada Press)
116 by Rick Grunder (BookBaby)
Sylvia by Twila Newey (BCC Press)
A New Age of Miracles by Mahonri Stewart (Prospero Arts and Media)

Short story
 "The Water Between Us" by Ryan Shoemaker (Barzakh 12, Spring 2020)
 Other finalists:
 "Every Nerve Singing" by Ryan Habermeyer (Fugue 58, Winter/Spring 2020)
 "Upcycling Death" by M.K. Hutchins (Brain Games: Stories to Astonish)
 "Certain Places" by William Morris (Dialogue 53:2, Summer 2020)
 "The Overcoat by Maurine Whipple (Irreantum17.1, Fall 2020)

Short-fiction collection
 A Craving for Beauty: The Collected Writings of Maurine Whipple by Maurine Whipple, edited by Veda Hale, Andrew Hall, and Lynne Larson (BCC Press)
 Other finalist:
 The Humans in the Walls and Other Stories by Eric James Stone (WordFire Press)

Poetry
 If Mother Braids a Waterfall by Dayna Patterson (Signature Books)
 Other finalists:
 I, Taliesin by Michael R. Collings (Self-published)
 Ese golpe de luz by Gabriel González Núñez (FlowerSong Books)
 An Imperfect Roundness by Melody Newey Johnson (BCC Press)

Creative nonfiction
 Lies of the Magpie: A Memoir by Maleah Day Warner (Author Academy Elite)
 Other finalists:
 Disparates by Patrick Madden (University of Nebraska Press)
 Wiving: A Memoir of Loving Then Leaving the Patriarchy by Caitlin Myer (Arcade)

Religious nonfiction
 Buried Treasures: Reading the Book of Mormon Again for the First Time by Michael Austin (BCC Press)
 Other finalists:
 Mercy without End by Lavina Fielding Anderson (Signature Books)
 Visions in a Seer Stone; Joseph Smith and the Making of the Book of Mormon by William L. Davis (University of North Carolina Press)
 Tabernacles of Clay: Sexuality and Gender in Modern Mormonism by Taylor G. Petrey (University of North Carolina Press)
 The Book of Mormon For the Least of These, volume 1: 1 Nephi-Words of Mormon by Fatimah Salleh and Margaret Olsen Hemming (BCC Press)

Audiobook
 Clogs and Shawls: Mormons, Moorlands, and the Search for Zion by Ann Chamberlin, narrated by Jacqueline de Boer
 Other finalists:
 Witchy War Series (Witchy Eye, Witchy Winter, Witchy Kingdom) by D. J. Butler, narrated by Courtney Patterson
 Kingdom of Nauvoo: The Rise and Fall of a Religious Empire on the American Frontier by Benjamin Park, narrated by Bob Souer
 The Book of Mormon for the Least of These, volume 1 by Fatimah Salleh and Margaret Olsen Hemmings, narrated by Margaret Olsen Hemmings
 Church History Department. Saints, Book 2, No Unhallowed Hand: 1846-1893 by the Church of Jesus Christ of Latter-day Saints, history department, narrated by Kirby Heyborne

Podcast
 Dialogue Book Report from Dialogue: A Journal of Mormon Thought, hosted by Andrew Hall
 Other finalists:
 The Center’s Studio Podcast from the Center for Latter-day Arts, hosted by Glen Nelson
 Mattathias Reads the World, hosted by Mattathias Westwood
 Unfinished: Short Creek, part of Witness Docs from Stitcher, hosted by Ash Sanders and Sarah Ventre

Picture book
 Nonsense: The Curious Story of Edward Gorey by Lori Mortensen and Chloe Bristol (HMH Books for Young Readers)
 Other finalists:
 You’ll Find Me by Amanda Rawson Hill and Joanne Le-Vriethoff. (Magination Press)
 I’ll Walk with You by Carol Lynn Pearson and Jane Sanders (Gibbs Smith)
 All Aboard the Moonlight Train by Kristyn Crow and Annie Won (Doubleday Books for Young Readers)

Middle-grade novel
 96 Miles by J. L. Esplin (Starscape/Tor Teen)
 Other finalists:
 What Stars are Made Of by Sarah Allen (Farrar, Straus and Giroux)
 Beginners Welcome by Cindy Baldwin (HarperCollins)
 On these Magic Shores by Yamile Saied Mendez (Tu)
 The Elephant’s Girl by Celesta Rimington (Crown Books for Young Readers)

Young-adult novel
 Furia by Yamile Saied Méndez (Algonquin Young Readers)
 Other finalists:
 Chasing Starlight by Teri Bailey Black (Tor Teen)
 Displaced by Dean Hughes (Atheneum Books)
 The Shadows Between Us by Tricia Levenseller (Feiwel and Friends)
 One Way or Another by Kara McDowell (Scholastic)

Comics
 Future Day Saints: Welcome to New Zion by Matt Page
 Other finalists:
 Everything Is Going to Be Okay by Dani Jones
 Pillar of Light: Joseph Smith’s First Vision by Andrew G. Knaupp and Sal Velluto
 Magic in the Valley: The Story of Moira Green, Witch by Brittany Long Olsen

Criticism
 "Repicturing the Restoration: New Art to Expand our Understanding" by Anthony Sweat (BYU Religious Studies Center)
 Other finalists:
 Spencer Kimball’s Record Collection: Essays on Mormon Music by Michael Hicks (Signature)
 "The 'New Woman' and the Woman’s Exponent: An Editorial Perspective" by Carol Cornwall Madsen (BYU Studies Quarterly, 59:3, 2000)
 Josephine Spencer: Her Collected Works, Vol. 1, 1887-1899 edited by Ardis E. Parshall and Michael Austin (BCC Press)
 A Craving for Beauty: The Collected Writings of Maurine Whipple edited by Veda Hale, Andrew Hall, and Lynne Larson (BCC Press)

Drama
 Mountain Law by Melissa Leilani Larson (Women’s Voices Play Festival, Orlando)
 Other finalists:
 The Captivity of Hannah Dunston by Glen Nelson (liberetto) and Lansing McLoskey (music) (Guerilla Opera Company)
 Give Me Moonlight by Ariel Mitchell (Motor House, Baltimore)
 Escape from Planet Death by Tom Russell and BYU School of Media Arts Students (BYU)

Film
 Heart of Africa written by Tshoper Kabambi and Margaret Blair Young, directed Tshoper Kabambi
 Other finalist:
 Gruff written and directed by Kohl Glass

2021

The winners were announced July 23, 2022, at the AML Conference. Note that, for the fiction awards, the additional of bilingual judges led to Spanish-language works published as far back as 2016. Additionally, with the return of a lyrics award, music was considered from the year prior to 2021.

Special award in fiction
 Estampas del Libro de Mormón by Gabriel González Núñez

Special award in fiction
Eugene England: A Mormon Liberal by Kristine L. Haglund (University of Illinois Press)

Novel
 Eleusis:The Long and Winding Road by R. de la Lanza (Intendencia de las Letras/Ulterior Editorial)
 The Jupiter Knife by D. J. Butler and Aaron Michael Ritchie (Baen)
 Picnic in the Ruins by Todd Robert Petersen (Counterpoint)
 Noria by Juan Antonio Santoyo (Ulterior Editorial)

Short fiction
 "Y no preguntes mas . . ." ("So Ask no More . . .") by Mario R. Montani (Irreantum)
 "Good Shepherd Church" by Riley Clay (Irreantum)
 "Between Glory and Ruin" James Goldberg (A Desolating Sickness: Stories of Pandemic)
 "Skillick’s Bride" Rachel Helps
 "The Wall" by Spencer Hyde (Image)

Young Adult Novel
 Beyond the Mapped Stars by Rosalyn Eves (Knopf)
 A Sisterhood of Secret Ambitions by Sheena Boekweg (Feiwel & Friends)
  Where I Belong Marcia Mickelson (Carolrhoda Lab)
 Fadeaway by E. B. Vickers (Knopf)
 In the Wild Light by Jeff Zentner (Crown Books)

Middle Grade Novel
 Cece Rios and the Desert of Souls by Kaela Rivera (HarperCollins)
 Breathing Underwater by Sarah Allen (Farrar, Straus and Giroux)
 Horace & Bunwinkle: The Case of the Rascally Raccoon by P.J. Gardner (illustrated by Dave Mottram) (Balzer + Bray)
 Friends Forever by Shannon Hale (illustrated by Leuyen Pham) (First Second)
 Tips for Magicians by Celesta Rimington (Crown Books for Young Readers)

Picture Book
 A Child of God by Chantel Bonner, Mauli Bonner, and Morgan Bissant (Shadow Mountain/Ensign Peak)
 The Boy and the Sea by Camile Andros and Amy June Bates (Abrams)
 We Believe: Illustrated Articles of Faith by Annie Poon (Covenant)
 Thankful by Elaine Vickers and Samantha Cotterill (Paula Wiseman Books)
 10 Little Disciples by Sierra Wilson (Ambassador-Emerald Intl)

Film
 Witnesses (directed by Mark Goodman, written by Mitch Davis)
 His Name is Green Flake (directed and written by Mauli Bonner)
 Maggie on Stratford Ave (directed and written by James May)
 Scenes from the Glittering World (directed by Jared Jakins)
 The Touch of the Master’s Hand (directed and written by Gregory Barnes)

Drama
 REDEEMHer: How I Screwed up my perfect Mormon life by Tatum Langton
 The King Stag by Janine Sobeck Knighton
 Gin Mummy by Melissa Leilani Larson
 1820: The Musical (book: George Nelson; music and lyrics: Kayliann Lowe Juarez, Doug Lowe, and Kendra Lowe)

Poetry
 The Ache and The Wing by Sunni Brown Wilkinson (Sundress Publications)
 Beneath the Falls by Mark D. Bennion (Resource publications)
 Down Their Spears by Jared Pearce (Cyberwit)

Podcast
 This Is the Gospel (LDS Living)
 Faith Matters hosted by Aubrey Chaves, Tim Chaves, and Terryl Givens; produced by Bill Turnbull and Branson Hirschi (Faith Matters Foundation)
 Latter-day Contemplation hosted by Christopher Hurtado and Riley Risto; created by Shiloh Logan and Riley Risto; edited by Christian Hutardo (Latter-day Peace Studies)
 Leading Saints hosted by Kurt Francom; executive produced by Kurt Francom; produced by Lillian Angelovic
 Sunstone Mormon History (Sunstone Education Foundation)

Comics
 Friends Forever by Shannon Hale (illustrated by Leuyen Pham) (First Second)
 Future Day Saints: The Gnomlaumite Crystal by Matt Page
 The Glass Looker: Collected Tales of Joseph Smith by Mark Elwood

Criticism
 Vardis Fisher: A Mormon Novelist by Michael Austin (University of Illinois Press)
 “The Case for Resurrection: A Mormon Movie Manifesto” by Barrett Burgin in Mormonism and the Movies, edited by Chris Wei, (BCC Press)
 “Theologies of the Afterlife in Mormon Women’s Late-Nineteenth-Century Poetry” Amy Easton-Flake in Nineteenth-Century American Women Writers and Theologies of the Afterlife (Routledge)
 Mormonism in SF edited by Adam McClain for SFRA Review 51:3, Summer 2021.

Creative Nonfiction
 Zion Earth, Zen Sky by Charles Shirō Inouye (Neal A. Maxwell Institute)
 Blossom as the Cliffrose: Mormon Legacies and the Beckoning Wild edited by Karin Anderson and Danielle Dubrasky (Torrey House Press)
 Ninety-Nine Fire Hoops by Allison Hong Merrill (She Writes Press)
 Scrupulous: My Obsessive Compulsion for God by Taylor Kerby (BCC Press)
 Where the Soul Hungers: One Doctor’s Journey from Atheism to Faith by Samuel M. Brown (Neal A. Maxwell Institute)

Religious Nonfiction
 Proclaim Peace: The Restoration’s Answer to an Age of Conflict by Patrick Q. Mason and J. David Pulsipher (Maxwell Institute)
 Stretching the Heavens: The Life of Eugene England and the Crisis of Modern Mormonism by Terryl L. Givens (University of North Carolina Press)
 The Restoration: God’s Call to the 21st Century World by Patrick Q. Mason (Faith Matters)
 The Anatomy of Book of Mormon Theology, Vols. 1 and 2 Joseph M. Spencer (Greg Kofford Books)
 Humility: A Practical Approach by Shawn Tucker (BCC Press)

Lyrics
 Fragility by Christian Asplund
 Therapy Sessions by David Archuleta
 A Fish of Earth by Emily Brown
 Pressure Machine by The Killers
 Strangest Congregations by Andrew Wiscombe

Winners of multiple AML Awards

The following people have won more than one AML Award (does not include being a finalist; does not include publishers or other non-person entities):

Mike Allred
 Special award 2005
 Special award in graphical narrative 2011

Lavina Fielding Anderson
Honorary Lifetime Membership 2002
Smith-Pettit Foundation Award for Outstanding Contribution to Mormon Letters 2017

Michael Austin
 Criticism 1995
 Religious nonfiction 2014, 2020

Phyllis Barber
 Autobiography 1993
 Smith-Pettit Foundation Award for Outstanding Contribution to Mormon Letters 2015

Philip Barlow
 Special Awards for Scholarly Publishing 2015 (with Terryl Givens), 2020 (with Spencer Fluhman)

Martine Bates
 Young-adult literature 1993, 1998

Elouise Bell
 Honorary lifetime membership 1988
 Personal essay 1990
 
John Serge Bennion
 Lifetime achievement 2020
 Personal essay 2006
 Short story 1988

Julie Berry
 Middle-grade novel 2014
 Young-adult novel 2019

Christopher Bigelow
 Editing 2003
 Lifetime membership 2012
 Publishing 2009

Andrew Black
 Film 2002 (honorable mention), 2003

Wayne Booth
 Honorary lifetime achievement 1988
 Special recognition in criticism 1988

Mary L. Bradford
 Honorary lifetime membership 1988
 Personal essay 1987

Bethany Brady Spalding
 Picture book 2014, 2016, 2019

Alison Maeser Brimley
 Short fiction 2017, 2018

Marilyn McMeen Miller Brown
 Novel 1980
 Poetry 1978 (honorable mention) 
 Smith-Pettit Foundation Award for Outstanding Contribution to Mormon Letters 2011

Gideon O. Burton
 Criticism 1994
 Honorary Lifetime Membership 2011
 Special Award Honorable Mention 2007

Alex Caldiero
 Poetry 1998, 2013

Ann Edwards Cannon
 Novel 1988
 Young-adult literature 2002

Orson Scott Card
 Criticism 2014
 Novel 1984, 1991, 1992, 2005 (honorable mention), 2006 (honorable mention)
 Smith-Pettit Foundation Award for Outstanding Contribution to Mormon Letters 2016

Stephen R. Carter
 Anthology 2017
 Comics 2014
 Personal essay 2008

Tyler Chadwick
 Poetry 2011
 Special award in publishing 2018

Robert A. Christmas
 Lifetime Achievement Award 2019
 Short fiction 1981
 Poetry 1987

Dennis Marden Clark
 Poetry 1986, 1988

Marden J. Clark
 Honorary Lifetime Membership 1991
 Personal Essay 1992
 Poetry 1978 (honorable mention), 1979, 1986, 1995

Ally Condie
 Middle-grade novel 2016
 Young-adult literature 2010, 2014

Darin Cozzens
 Short fiction 2007 (honorable mention), 2010 (honorable mention)
 Short-fiction collection 2016

Richard Cracroft
 Honorary Lifetime Membership 2000
 Smith-Pettit Award for Outstanding Contribution to Mormon Letters 2010

Chris Crowe
 Novel 2002
 Young-adult general novel 2013

James V. D'Arc
 Honorary lifetime membership 2009
 Special award 2006

Ann Dee Ellis
 Middle-grade novel 2014 (honorable mention), 2017
 Young-adult literature 2007

Eugene England
Criticism 1982–83
Personal essay 1984, 1993

Michael Fillerup
Short story 1986, 1991

Judith Freeman
Novel 1989, 1996

Brant A. Gardner
 Criticism 2011
 Religious nonfiction 2015

Terryl L. Givens
 Biography 2011
 Criticism 2007
 Devotional 2012 (with Fiona Givens)
 Lifetime AML Membership 2008
 Special award for scholarly publishing 2015 (with Philip L. Barlow)
 Special award in religious nonfiction 2020 (shared with many other people connected to the Maxwell Institute)

James Goldberg 
 Drama 2009 
 Novel 2012 
 Special award in Literature and Performance 2019 (with Nicole Wilkes Goldberg, Ariel Rivera, Nicole Pinnell)

Darius Gray
 Historical fiction 2003
 Novel 2000

Shannon Hale
 Comics 2017
 Young-adult literature 2003 (honorable mention), 2004, 2005, 2006 (honorable mention)

Andrew Hall
 Podcast 2020
 Special award in literary journalism 2011

Angela Hallstrom
 Editing 2010
 Novel 2008
 Service to AML 2006

Jack Harrell
 Criticism 2016
 Marilyn Brown Novel Award 1998
 Short fiction 2010

Mette Ivie Harrison
 Young-adult literature 2004 (honorable mention), 2007 (honorable mention)

Edward L. Hart 
 Honorary Lifetime Membership 1991
 Poetry 1979

Kimberley Heuston
 Young-adult literature 2002 (honorable mention), 2003

Michael Hicks
Adaptation 2012
Criticism 1989, 2017

Susan Elizabeth Howe
Lifetime Achievement Award 2016
Poetry 1989, 1997

Dean Hughes
Novel 1998, 2007 (honorable mention), 2019
Outstanding Achievement Award 2013
Young-adult literature 1994, 2005 (honorable mention)
Smith-Pettit Foundation Award for Outstanding Contribution to Mormon Letters 2005

P. G. Karamesines
 Criticism 2005, 2006
 Novel 2004
 Personal essay 2006 (honorable mention)

Eric W. Jepson
Editing 2010
Special award for scholarly publishing 2015

McArthur Krishna
 Picture book 2014, 2016, 2019

Bruce W. Jorgensen 
Criticism 1987, 1996
Honorary Lifetime Membership 2002
Short fiction 1994

Clifton Holt Jolley
 Critical Writing 1975–77
 Humor (second place) 1982–83

Clinton F. Larson
 Honorary Lifetime Membership 1991
 Poetry 1978, 1983, 1988 (Special Recognition)

Lance Larsen
 AML Lifetime Achievement Award 2014
 Poetry 2005, 2009, 2018

Melissa Leilani Larson
 Drama 2002 (honorable mention), 2009, 2014, 2015, 2020
 Smith-Pettit Foundation Award for Outstanding Contribution to Mormon Letters 2018

Ryan Little
 Film 2002 (honorable mention), 2003

Gerald Lund
Honorary lifetime membership 1988
Novel 1991, 1993

Patrick Madden
 Creative nonfiction 2016
 Personal essay 2008, 2010

Donald R. Marshall
 Lifetime Achievement Award 2015
 Marilyn Brown Novel Award 2005 (honorable mention)
 Short fiction 1975–1977

Neal A. Maxwell
Devotional literature 1999
Special Commendation for Sustained Excellence in the Mormon Sermon 1982-83

Adam S. Miller
 Personal essay 2011
 Religious nonfiction 2018
 Special award in religious nonfiction 2020 (shared)
 Special award in religious nonfiction publishing 2017

Brandon Mull
 Young-adult literature 2006, 2008

Coke Newell
 Novel 2006
 Short fiction 2003

Jennifer A. Nielsen
 Middle-grade fiction 2012
 Middle-grade novel 2019

Chieko N. Okazaki
 Devotional literature 1997
 Sermon 1993

Dayna Patterson
 Poetry 2020
 Special award in publishing 2018

Carol Lynn Pearson
 AML Lifetime Achievement Award 2018
 Drama 2007
 Special award 1984

Steven L. Peck
 Novel 2011, 2017
 Short fiction 2014
 Short-fiction collection 2015
 Smith-Pettit Foundation Award for Outstanding Contribution to Mormon Letters 2020

Anne Perry
 Novel 1994, 1999
 Smith-Pettit Foundation Award for Outstanding Contribution to Mormon Letters 2007

Todd Robert Petersen
 Marilyn Brown Novel Award 2007
 Novel 2009

Kathleen Peterson
 Picture book 2014, 2019

Levi S. Peterson
 Biography 1988
 Honorary Lifetime Membership 1988
 Novel 1986
 Short fiction 1978, 1983, 2016
 Short-story anthology 1983
 Smith-Pettit Foundation Award for Outstanding Contribution to Mormon Letters 2009

LeUyen Pham
 Picture book 2014 (honorable mention)
 Comics 2017

Louise Plummer
 Young adult literature 1991, 1995, 2001, 2007 (finalist)

Annie Poon
 Film 2006, 2016

Janette Rallison
 Young-adult literature 2004 (honorable mention), 2006 (honorable mention)

Thomas F. Rogers
Drama 1982–83
Honorary Lifetime Membership 2001
Special Award for Religious Non-fiction Publishing 2016 (shared with Jonathan Langford and Linda Hunter Adams)

Karen Rosenbaum
 AML Lifetime Achievement Award 2014
 Short fiction 1978 (honorable mention), 2002 (honorable mention), 2019
 Short-story Collection 2015

Thomas Russell
 Film 2006 (honorable mention), 2021

Eric Samuelsen
Drama 1994, 1997, 1999
 Smith–Pettit Foundation Award for Outstanding Contribution to Mormon Letters 2012

Brandon Sanderson
 Novel 2005, 2006 (honorable mention), 2014 (honorable mention)
 Young-adult literature 2007 (honorable mention)
 Young-adult speculative fiction 2013

Neila Seshachari
 In Memoriam 2002
 Service to Mormon Letters 1993

Linda Sillitoe
 Criticism 1980
 Novel 1987
 Poetry 1975–77, 1993
 Poetry and Short Fiction 1981

Tim Slover
 Drama 1995, 1996, 2002 (honorable mention), 2006, 2017

Steven P. Sondrup
 Criticism 1978
 Honorary Lifetime Membership 1988

Darrel Spencer
 Short fiction 1987, 1993, 2000

Mahonri Stewart
 Drama 2012
 Lifetime AML Membership 2012

Emma Lou Thayne
 Autobiography 2011
 Honorary Lifetime Membership 1992
 Personal essay 1989
 Poetry 1980, 1985

Douglas H. Thayer
 Honorary Lifetime Membership 1988
 Short fiction 1975–77, 2011
 Smith-Pettit Foundation Award for Outstanding Contribution to Mormon Letters 2008
 Novel 1982–83, 2003

Brady Udall
 Novel 2001, 2010
 Short fiction 1997

Laurel T. Ulrich
Biography 1991
Honorary lifetime membership 1988

Christian Vuissa
 Film 2002, 2008

Rick Walton
 Children's literature 1996
 Picture book 2002
 Smith-Pettit Foundation Award for Outstanding Contribution to Mormon Letters 2006

Holly Welker
Creative nonfiction 2016 (honorable mention)
Personal essay 1997
Poetry, Young Poet's Prize 1983

Maurine Whipple
 Honorary lifetime membership 1991
 Short-fiction collection 2020

Greg Whiteley
 Film 2005
 Video series 2016

Carol Lynch Williams
 Middle-grade literature 2001
 Young-adult literature 2010

Terry Tempest Williams
Honorary lifetime membership 1998
Personal essay 1991, 1995

Patricia Wiles
 Middle-grade literature 2004 
 Young-adult literature 2005

William A. Wilson
Criticism 1990
Honorary lifetime membership 1988

Margaret Blair Young
 Drama 2000
 Film 2020
 Historical fiction 2003
 Novel 2000
 Short fiction 1992
 Smith–Pettit Foundation Award for Outstanding Contribution to Mormon Letters 2014

Darlene Young
 Poetry 2019
 Service to AML 2010

Jeff Zentner
Young-adult novel 2016, 2017

See also
 Whitney Awards

Notes

References

Mormon literature
American literary awards
Awards established in 1977
1977 establishments in Utah